Djaili Amadou Amal is a Cameroonian writer, and feminist activist.

Life 
Djaili Amadou Amal is a Fula, native to the Diamare in the Far North region of Cameroon. She grew up in the region's principal city, Maroua. She writes of the Fulbe culture and explores the social problems of both a contemporary and a traditional nature. Her work confronts the problems of women in Fulani society, as well as social problems in her region, the Sahel, especially the discrimination against women. Some of her novels are Walaande, which is a Fulfulde word for  conjugal unity, addressing the issue of polygamy among the Fulani who commonly practice polygamy.  Walaande tells the story of four wives who have conceded to  "the art of sharing a husband".

Two of her other novels are Mistiriijo and La Mangeuse d'âmes (in English, The Eater of Souls). She writes mostly in the French language.

Recognition
On the 2nd of December 2020, Djaïli Amadou with her book Les Impatientes won the 33rd French Literary award Prix Goncourt des Lycéens as the first female African writer to arrive the finals of the literary competition. The book will also be listed as the Choix Goncourt de l'Orient on 8 December 2020, the Choix Goncourt UK on 18 March 2021, and the Choix Goncourt Tunisia on April 3, 2021.

Back in Cameroon, the writer was appointed UNICEF Goodwill Ambassador on the 5th of March 2021  to support the organization in its advocacy for the rights of children.

Bibliography
Walaande, l'art de partager un mari, éditions Ifrikiya, Yaoundé, 2010, 134 p., 
Mistiriijo, la mangeuse d'âmes, éditions Ifrikiya, Yaoundé, 2013,   
Munyal, les larmes de la patience, éditions Proximité, Yaoundé, 2017 
 Les Impatientes, éditions Emmanuelle Collas, Paris, 2020, 252p.,  – prix Goncourt des lycéens 2020.
Cœur du Sahel, Paris, Emmanuelle Collas, 2022, 364 p

References

External links
Biography in Africultures
Interview with Djaili Amadou Amal, Ouest-France 
Djaili Amadou Amal across in France
Djaïli Amadou Amal in Actualité de l'édition et du livre en Afrique

Cameroonian women writers
Living people
Cameroonian writers in French
Cameroonian women novelists
Cameroonian novelists
21st-century Cameroonian writers
21st-century Cameroonian women writers
Cameroonian feminists
1975 births